The Southwestern Conference is a high school athletic league whose members are located in Cuyahoga and Lorain counties, mainly southwest of the city of Cleveland.  The league was formed in 1937 and is part of the Ohio High School Athletic Association (OHSAA).

Current members

Notes
For the 2013-2014 school year, Midpark High School merged with Berea High School to form the Berea-Midpark Titans.
Avon High School was approved to join the SWC in 2015-16 to accommodate the Berea-Midpark merger.
Lakewood and Midview joined the SWC in 2015-16.
In September 2013, Brecksville-Broadview Heights was invited to join the Suburban League for the 2015-16 school year, which they accepted after a board vote.
In October 2013, North Ridgeville agreed to join the SWC as a replacement for Brecksville-Broadview Heights in 2015-16.
On April 16, 2019, Lakewood announced that it would leave the SWC following the 2019-2020 school year to join the Great Lakes Conference.
On January 15, 2020, Elyria accepted the invitation to join the SWC in 2021-22.
On February 20, 2020, North Olmsted and Westlake announced that they will be leaving the SWC and joining the Great Lakes Conference in 2021-22.

Former members
 Rocky River Pirates (1937–2005)
 Oberlin Indians (1937–1964)
 Fairview Warriors (1940–2005)
 Lorain Clearview Clippers (1945–1954)
 Wellington Dukes (1946–1954)
 Medina Bees (1947–1986)
 Bay Rockets (1954–2005)
 Berea Braves (1937-1950, 2005–2013; consolidated into Berea-Midpark)
 Lakewood Rangers (2015-2020)
 Middleburg Heights Midpark Meteors (2005–2013; consolidated into Berea-Midpark)
 Brecksville-Broadview Heights Bees (2005–2015)
Westlake Demons (1954-2021)
North Olmsted Eagles (1954-2021)

Membership timeline

References

Ohio high school sports conferences